Lemuel Jackson Bowden (January 16, 1815January 2, 1864) was an American lawyer and politician from Williamsburg, Virginia.

Early life
Bowden was born in 1815 in Williamsburg, Virginia, and graduated from the College of William and Mary in 1831-1832.

Career
As an adult, Bowden settled in Williamsburg and practiced law there. He was elected to the Virginia House of Delegates three times, serving from 1841 to 1846.

In 1850, Lyons was elected to the Virginia Constitutional Convention of 1850. He was one of two delegates elected from the Tidewater delegate district made up of Essex, King and Queen, Middlesex and Mathews Counties.

In 1860, he was a presidential elector from his Congressional District.

During the American Civil War Bowden served as mayor of Williamsburg, Virginia from 1862 to 1863 in a region occupied by Federal troops. Following the creation of West Virginia organized by Unionist Virginians in 1863, the Restored Government of Virginia chose Bowden to represent Virginia in the United States Senate in 1863 as a member of the Unionist Party. There he served until his death.

Death and family

Bowden died on January 2, 1864, of smallpox while in office at Washington, D.C. and he is buried in the Congressional Cemetery there.

Bowden's son, Thomas Russell Bowden, served as Attorney General of Virginia in both the Restored Government and the post-war Reconstruction era government, and his nephew, George E. Bowden, represented Virginia's 2nd congressional district in the United States House of Representatives from 1887 to 1891.

See also
List of United States Congress members who died in office (1790–1899)

References

Bibliography

External links
Biographic sketch at U.S. Congress website

1815 births
1864 deaths
People from Williamsburg, Virginia
American people of French descent
Unionist Party United States senators from Virginia
Democratic Party United States senators from Virginia
Virginia Unionists
Mayors of Williamsburg, Virginia
Virginia lawyers
College of William & Mary alumni
People of Virginia in the American Civil War
Southern Unionists in the American Civil War
Deaths from smallpox
Burials at the Congressional Cemetery